Björn Olof Söder (born 3 January 1976) is a Swedish Sweden Democrats politician who served as Second Deputy Speaker of the Riksdag from September 2014 to September 2018. He has been a Member of the Riksdag (SD) for Stockholm County since October 2010. He previously served as Leader of the Sweden Democrats in the Riksdag from 2010 to 2014 and Secretary of the Sweden Democrats from 2005 to 2015.

Background and education 
Söder was born in Höganäs Municipality, Skåne County, Sweden. After he had completed upper secondary education (gymnasium) in 1995, he began engineering studies at the Lund Institute of Technology. Between 1997 and 1998, he made his compulsory military service at the K 3 regiment in Karlsborg. After finishing his  military service he started to study again but took a break between 2000 and 2002, to work as an information technology consultant. He finished his studies in 2004, when he earned a Master of Engineering degree in chemical engineering from the Lund Institute of Technology. Before being elected to parliament, Söder founded a web design business with SD leader Jimmie Akesson.

Political career 
Söder first joined the Swedish Progress Party in 1991, but left the party in 1994, after internal struggles and instead joined the Sweden Democrats. He was elected as a substitute member of the party board in 1997, but left the board to serve as secretary of the Sweden Democrat Youth between 1998 and 2000. Between 1998 and 2002, he was a member of the municipal council in Höör Municipality for the Sweden Democrats. In 2001, he was again elected as a member of the party board and later the same year of the party executive committee. In the same year he was also elected as a member of the church assembly of the Diocese of Lund and as a substitute member of the church assembly of the Church of Sweden.

At the Sweden Democrats' national meeting in 2003, Söder was elected as deputy party chairman. He left this post at the national meeting in 2005, when he was elected as party secretary. In 2005, he was once again elected as a member of the church assembly of the Diocese of Lund and as a full member of the church assembly of the Church of Sweden. Between 2006 and 2010, Söder was a member and party group leader of the Sweden Democrats in the Scania Regional Council as well as a member of the municipal council in Helsingborg Municipality.

In the 2010 general election, the Sweden Democrats for the first time entered the Riksdag with 5.70% of the votes and Söder, placed second on the party's national ballot, was elected as a Member of the Riksdag (SD) along with 19 other Sweden Democrats politicians. On 24 September 2010, he was elected as group leader of the Sweden Democrats in the Riksdag.

After Sweden's victory in the 2012 Eurovision Song Contest, he expressed disappointment and shame that the song was performed in English and not Swedish. After a massive backlash, he deleted the comment from his social media pages, and said that he now realizes that the Eurovision song contest "apparently is a holy cow that must not be criticized in any way, just like multiculturalism."

The Jerusalem Post reported in 2014 that Björn Söder declared in an interview that most people of Jewish origin, who have become Swedes, leave their Jewish identity and that it is important to distinguish between citizenship and nationhood. Lena Posner Körösi, of the Official Council of Jewish Communities in Sweden told The Guardian that Söder’s statements were “exactly like in 1930s Germany” and that they constitute “good old right-wing anti-Semitism". The statement of the Sweden Democrat politician about Jews was listed as one of the ten worst anti-Semitic incidents in the world in 2014 by the Simon Wiesenthal Center, according to Dagens Nyheter.

Söder responded to these claims of anti-Semitism with a column of his own that appeared in The Jerusalem Post on January 5, 2015, writing in part, "In a biased article in one of Sweden’s largest newspapers, Dagens Nyheter (DN: Daily News), some of my statements were dramatically taken out of context to erroneously credit me with opinions that do not correspond with reality. Politically biased journalists and political opponents have further distorted the statements, resulting in a presentation virtually the complete opposite of my actual statements and opinions. This is now distributed in the international press, such as in the Post, which therefore necessitates a clarification on my part."

On 19 July 2021 Söder was awarded the Mkhitar Gosh Medal by president Armen Sarksyan and presented by the Armenian ambassador to Sweden Alexander Arzoumanian. Björn was awarded the medal for his work on the Armenian genocide and for working on making the Swedish government recognize the genocide.

Distinctions 
  Mkhitar Gosh Medal, (Armenia).

References 

Living people
1976 births
Members of the Riksdag from the Sweden Democrats
Swedish bloggers
Swedish Lutherans
Lund University alumni
Deputy speakers of the Riksdag
People from Höganäs Municipality